Donnie James Meche (born October 10, 1974 in Rayne, Louisiana) is an American jockey in Thoroughbred horse racing.

Donnie Meche won his first race at Evangeline Downs in May 1993. He was the top apprentice rider at Louisiana Downs in 1994.

He is ten minutes younger than twin brother Lonnie, who, along with younger brother Cody, is also a jockey.

References

Year-end charts 

1974 births
Living people
American jockeys
Cajun jockeys
People from Rayne, Louisiana